Sue Ramsey Johnston Ferguson (1897–1977) was a North Carolina political figure.

Ferguson graduated from Woman's College (now The University of North Carolina at Greensboro) in 1918. She later received a master's degree from Columbia University in New York. In 1934, she married Raymond S. Ferguson.

Ferguson served as a trustee of the University of North Carolina and as a member of the North Carolina State Board of Education. She served in the North Carolina Senate for the 28th district from 1947 to 1949. While in the Senate she proposed the creation of a committee to investigate the North Carolina state school system, leading to the formation of the State Education Commission.

She was a member of Delta Kappa Gamma.

References
Finding Aid for the Sue Ramsey Johnston Ferguson Papers at The University of North Carolina at Greensboro
Political Graveyard: Delta Kappa Gamma 

Democratic Party North Carolina state senators
1897 births
1977 deaths
Women state legislators in North Carolina
20th-century American politicians
20th-century American women politicians